Live at Carnegie Hall is a 1976 live double album by the English progressive rock band Renaissance. It presented songs from all of the band's Annie Haslam-era studio albums thus far, including the forthcoming (at the time of the concerts) Scheherazade and Other Stories.

Expanded 2019 edition
In 2019 Esoteric Recordings announced a re-mastered and 3 CD expanded edition of the album which was released on 31 May 2019.

Track listing
All songs by Michael Dunford and Betty Thatcher, except where noted.
Side A
"Prologue" (Dunford) - 7:35
"Ocean Gypsy" - 7:48
"Can You Understand?" - 10:41

Side B
"Carpet of the Sun" - 4:15
"Running Hard" - 9:43 
"Mother Russia" - 10:48

Side C
"Song of Scheherazade" - 28:50 
a. "Fanfare" (John Tout)
b. "The Betrayal" (Jon Camp, Tout, Dunford)
c. "The Sultan"
d. "Love Theme" (Camp)
e. "The Young Prince and Princess as told by Scheherazade"
f. "Festival Preparations" (Camp, Tout, Dunford)
g. "Fugue for the Sultan" (Tout)
h. "The Festival"
i. "Finale" (Camp, Tout, Dunford)

Side D
"Ashes Are Burning" - 23:50

Expanded edition

Personnel

Renaissance
Annie Haslam – lead (all but 7a-d, 7f, 7g) and backing vocals
Michael Dunford – acoustic guitars, electric guitar, backing vocals
John Tout – keyboards, backing vocals
Jon Camp – bass, lead  vocals on track 7c, backing vocals
Terence Sullivan – drums, backing vocals, percussion

Additional musicians
New York Philharmonic and choir with Tony Cox, orchestra conductor

Production
Carmine Rubino - recording engineer
Dick Plant - mixing at De Lane Lea Studios, Wembley, UK
Barry Kidd - mixing assistant

Notes

References

Renaissance (band) albums
1976 live albums
Sire Records live albums
Albums recorded at Carnegie Hall
RCA Records live albums